The Alvernia Golden Wolves football team represents Alvernia University in college football at the NCAA Division III level. The Golden Wolves are members of the Middle Atlantic Conferences (MAC), fielding its team in the MAC since 2018. The Golden Wolves play their home games at Alvernia University Stadium in Reading, Pennsylvania. 

Their head coach is Steve Azzanesi, who took over the position for the 2022 season.

History 
On October 5, 2016, athletic director Bill Stiles and Alvernia University president Dr. Tom Flynn announced that American football would be added as a varsity sport for the 2018 NCAA Division III season. The team would be a member of the Middle Atlantic Conferences (MAC) alongside the school's other athletic programs.

On July 29, 2018, the school unveiled the team's maroon and gold uniforms.

Conference affiliations
 Middle Atlantic Conferences (2018–present)

List of head coaches

Key

Coaches

Year-by-year results

Notes

References

External links
 

 
American football teams established in 2018
2018 establishments in Pennsylvania